Evangelina García Prince (30 September 1934 – 3 June 2019) was a Venezuelan women's rights activist, politician and academic. She served as a Senator and was a member of the Comisión para la Reforma del Estado (COPRE), a presidential commission.

References

1934 births
2019 deaths
Venezuelan politicians